Prestige Public School (also known as Prestige International School), Indore is a public school located in Indore, India, at Prestige Vihar, Vijay Nagar. The school is affiliated with the Central Board of Secondary Education (CBSE), and CBSE-i (CBSE-International), it is one of the only 50 schools affiliated with CBSEi across India. It recently came up with its new ventures in Dewas (Prestige Public School, Dewas) and Gwalior (Prestige Public School, Gwalior).

History

Prestige Public School with its sister institutions was founded by Shri N. N. Jain in 2004. Its current principal Mr. Prakash Chaudhary was also the former chairman of Indore Sahodaya Group.

Sister Institutions
Prestige Institute of Management and Research, Indore
Prestige Institute of Management and Research, (PG), Indore
Prestige Institute of Management and Research, (UG), Indore
Prestige Law Department (PIMR), Indore
Prestige Institute of Engineering and Management Research, Indore
Prestige International School, Indore
Prestige Institute of Management, Gwalior
Prestige Institute of Management, Dewas
Prestige Public School, Dewas

References

Private schools in Madhya Pradesh
Schools in Indore
Educational institutions established in 1994
1994 establishments in Madhya Pradesh